Below is the list of populated places in Rize Province, Turkey by the districts. In the following lists first place in each list is the administrative center of the district.

Rize
 Rize
 Akarsu, Rize
 Akpınar, Rize
 Aktaş, Rize
 Alipaşa, Rize
 Ambarlık, Rize
 Ayane, Rize
 Azaklıhoca, Rize
 Balıkçılar, Rize
 Beştepe, Rize
 Bıldırcınköy, Rize
 Boğaz, Rize
 Camidağı, Rize
 Çaybaşı, Rize
 Çaycılar, Rize
 Çaykent, Rize
 Çiftekavak, Rize
 Çimenli, Rize
 Derebaşı, Rize
 Dörtyol, Rize
 Düzköy, Rize
 Elmalı, Rize
 Erenköy, Rize
 Gölgeli, Rize
 Gündoğdu, Rize
 Güzelköy, Rize
 Güzelyurt, Rize
 Karasu, Rize
 Karayemiş, Rize
 Kendirli, Rize
 Ketenli, Rize
 Kırklartepesi, Rize
 Kocatepe, Rize
 Köprülü, Rize
 Kurtuluş, Rize
 Küçükçayır, Rize
 Küçükköy, Rize
 Melek, Rize
 Muradiye, Rize
 Ortapazar, Rize
 Örnek, Rize
 Pazarköy, Rize
 Pekmezli, Rize
 Pınarbaşı, Rize
 Selimiye, Rize
 Soğukçeşme, Rize
 Söğütlü, Rize
 Sütlüce, Rize
 Taşköprü, Rize
 Taşlık, Rize
 Taşpınar, Rize
 Tekke, Rize
 Topkaya, Rize
 Tuğlalı, Rize
 Uzunköy, Rize
 Üçkaya, Rize
 Veliköy, Rize
 Yemişlik, Rize
 Yenidoğan, Rize
 Yenigüzelköy, Rize
 Yenikale, Rize
 Yenikasarcılar, Rize
 Yeniselimiye, Rize
 Yeşildere, Rize
 Yolüstü, Rize
 Yolveren, Rize
 Zincirliköprü, Rize

Ardeşen
 Ardeşen
 Akdere, Ardeşen	
 Akkaya, Ardeşen	
 Armağan, Ardeşen	
 Aşağıdurak, Ardeşen	
 Bahar, Ardeşen
 Barış, Ardeşen
 Bayırcık, Ardeşen	
 Beyazkaya, Ardeşen	
 Çıraklar, Ardeşen	
 Dere, Ardeşen
 Doğanay, Ardeşen	
 Duygulu, Ardeşen	
 Elmalık, Ardeşen
 Eskiarmutluk, Ardeşen	
 Gündoğan, Ardeşen	
 Güney, Ardeşen	
 Hoşdere, Ardeşen	
 Işıklı, Ardeşen	
 Kahveciler, Ardeşen
 Kavaklıdere, Ardeşen
 Kirazlık, Ardeşen	
 Konak, Ardeşen
 Köprüköy, Ardeşen	
 Kurtuluş, Ardeşen	
 Küçükköy, Ardeşen	
 Manganez, Ardeşen	
 Ortaalan, Ardeşen	
 Özgür, Ardeşen	
 Pınarlı, Ardeşen	
 Pirinçlik, Ardeşen	
 Serindere, Ardeşen	
 Seslikaya, Ardeşen	
 Sinan, Ardeşen	
 Şehitlik, Ardeşen	
 Şendere, Ardeşen	
 Şentepe, Ardeşen
 Şenyamaç, Ardeşen	
 Şenyurt, Ardeşen	
 Tunca, Ardeşen	
 Yamaçdere, Ardeşen	
 Yavuz, Ardeşen	
 Yayla, Ardeşen
 Yeniköy, Ardeşen	
 Yeniyol, Ardeşen	
 Yeşiltepe, Ardeşen	
 Yukarıdurak, Ardeşen	
 Yurtsever, Ardeşen	
 Zeytinlik, Ardeşen

Çamlıhemşin
 Çamlıhemşin	
 Behice, Çamlıhemşin	
 Boğaziçi, Çamlıhemşin	
 Çatköy, Çamlıhemşin	
 Çayırdüzü, Çamlıhemşin	
 Dikkaya, Çamlıhemşin	
 Güllüköy, Çamlıhemşin	
 Güroluk, Çamlıhemşin	
 Kale, Çamlıhemşin	
 Köprübaşı, Çamlıhemşin	
 Meydanköy, Çamlıhemşin	
 Komilo	
 Ortaklar, Çamlıhemşin	
 Ortanköy, Çamlıhemşin	
 Ortayayla, Çamlıhemşin	
 Sıraköy, Çamlıhemşin	
 Şenköy, Çamlıhemşin	
 Şenyuva, Çamlıhemşin	
 Topluca, Çamlıhemşin	
 Ülkü, Çamlıhemşin	
 Yaylaköy, Çamlıhemşin	
 Yazlık, Çamlıhemşin	
 Yolkıyı, Çamlıhemşin	
 Yukarışimşirli, Çamlıhemşin	
 Zilkale, Çamlıhemşin

Çayeli
 Çayeli
 Abdullahhoca, Çayeli	
 Armutlu, Çayeli	
 Aşıklar, Çayeli	
 Başköy, Çayeli	
 Beşikçiler, Çayeli	
 Beyazsu, Çayeli	
 Buzlupınar, Çayeli	
 Büyükköy, Çayeli	
 Çataldere, Çayeli	
 Çeşmeli, Çayeli	
 Çınartepe, Çayeli	
 Çilingir, Çayeli	
 Çukurluhoca, Çayeli	
 Demirhisar, Çayeli	
 Derecik, Çayeli	
 Düzgeçit, Çayeli	
 Erdemli, Çayeli	
 Erenler, Çayeli	
 Esendağ, Çayeli	
 Gemiciler, Çayeli	
 Gürgenli, Çayeli	
 Gürpınar, Çayeli	
 Güzeltepe, Çayeli	
 Haremtepe, Çayeli	
 İncesırt, Çayeli	
 İncesu, Çayeli	
 Kaçkar, Çayeli	
 Kaptanpaşa, Çayeli	
 Karaağaç, Çayeli	
 Kemerköy, Çayeli	
 Kestanelik, Çayeli	
 Köprübaşı, Çayeli	
 Latifli, Çayeli	
 Madenli, Çayeli	
 Maltepe, Çayeli	
 Musadağı, Çayeli	
 Ormancık, Çayeli	
 Ortaköy, Çayeli	
 Sarısu, Çayeli	
 Sefalı, Çayeli	
 Selimiye, Çayeli	
 Seslidere, Çayeli	
 Sırtköy, Çayeli	
 Şirinköy, Çayeli	
 Uzundere, Çayeli	
 Yamaç, Çayeli	
 Yanıkdağ, Çayeli	
 Yavuzlar, Çayeli	
 Yenice, Çayeli	
 Yenihisar, Çayeli	
 Yenitepe, Çayeli	
 Yeşilırmak, Çayeli	
 Yeşilköy, Çayeli	
 Yeşiltepe, Çayeli	
 Yıldızeli, Çayeli	
 Zafer, Çayeli

Derepazarı
 Derepazarı
 Bahattinpaşa, Derepazarı		
 Bürücek, Derepazarı		
 Çakmakçılar, Derepazarı		
 Çeşme, Derepazarı		
 Çukurlu, Derepazarı		
 Esentepe, Derepazarı		
 Kirazdağı, Derepazarı		
 Maltepe, Derepazarı		
 Sandıktaş, Derepazarı		
 Uzunkaya, Derepazarı		
 Yanıktaş, Derepazarı

Fındıklı
 Fındıklı
 Aksu, Fındıklı
 Arılı, Fındıklı	
 Aslandere, Fındıklı	
 Avcılar, Fındıklı	
 Beydere, Fındıklı	
 Cennet, Fındıklı	
 Çağlayan, Fındıklı	
 Çınarlı, Fındıklı	
 Derbent, Fındıklı	
 Doğanay, Fındıklı	
 Gürsu, Fındıklı	
 Hara, Fındıklı	
 Hürriyet, Fındıklı
 Ihlamurlu, Fındıklı	
 Karaali, Fındıklı	
 Kıyıcık, Fındıklı	
 Liman, Fındıklı
 Meyvalı, Fındıklı	
 Saatköy, Fındıklı	
 Sahil, Fındıklı
 Sulak, Fındıklı	
 Sümer, Fındıklı	
 Tatlısu, Fındıklı
 Tepecik, Fındıklı	
 Yaylacılar, Fındıklı	
 Yeniköy, Fındıklı	
 Yenimahalle, Fındıklı
 Yenişehitlik, Fındıklı

Güneysu
 Güneysu
 Asmalıırmak, Güneysu	
 Ballıdere, Güneysu	
 Başaran, Güneysu	
 Başköy, Güneysu	
 Bulutlu, Güneysu	
 Çamlıca, Güneysu	
 Dumankaya, Güneysu	
 Güneli, Güneysu	
 Gürgen, Güneysu	
 İslahiye, Güneysu	
 Kıbledağı, Güneysu	
 Kiremit, Güneysu	
 Ortaköy, Güneysu	
 Selamet, Güneysu	
 Tepebaşı, Güneysu	
 Yarımada, Güneysu	
 Yenicami, Güneysu	
 Yeniköy, Güneysu	
 Yeşilköy, Güneysu	
 Yeşilyurt, Güneysu	
 Yukarıislahiye, Güneysu	
 Yüksekköy, Güneysu

Hemşin
 Hemşin
 Akyamaç, Hemşin		
 Bilenköy, Hemşin		
 Çamlıtepe, Hemşin		
 Hilal, Hemşin		
 Kantarlı, Hemşin		
 Leventköy, Hemşin		
 Nurluca, Hemşin		
 Yaltkaya, Hemşin

İkizdere
 İkizdere
 Ayvalık, İkizdere	
 Ballıköy, İkizdere	
 Başköy, İkizdere	
 Bayırköy, İkizdere	
 Cevizlik, İkizdere	
 Çamlıkköy, İkizdere	
 Çataltepe, İkizdere	
 Çiçekli, İkizdere	
 Çifteköprü, İkizdere	
 Demirkapı, İkizdere	
 Dereköy, İkizdere	
 Diktaş, İkizdere	
 Eskice, İkizdere	
 Gölyayla, İkizdere	
 Güneyce, İkizdere	
 Gürdere, İkizdere	
 Güvenköy, İkizdere	
 Ihlamur, İkizdere	
 Ilıcaköy, İkizdere	
 Kama, İkizdere	
 Meşeköy, İkizdere	
 Ortaköy, İkizdere	
 Rüzgarlı, İkizdere	
 Sivrikaya, İkizdere	
 Şimşirli, İkizdere	
 Tozköy, İkizdere	
 Tulumpınar, İkizdere	
 Yağcılar, İkizdere	
 Yerelma, İkizdere

İyidere
 İyidere
 Büyükçiftlikköyü, İyidere		
 Çiftlik, İyidere		
 Denizgören, İyidere		
 Kalecik, İyidere		
 Köşklü, İyidere		
 Taşhane, İyidere		
 Yaylacılar, İyidere

Kalkandere
 Kalkandere
 Çağlayan, Kalkandere		
 Çayırlı, Kalkandere		
 Dilsizdağı, Kalkandere		
 Dülgerli, Kalkandere		
 Esendere, Kalkandere		
 Esentepe, Kalkandere		
 Fındıklı, Kalkandere		
 Geçitli, Kalkandere		
 Hurmalık, Kalkandere		
 İnci, Kalkandere		
 İncirli, Kalkandere		
 Kayabaşı, Kalkandere		
 Ormanlı, Kalkandere		
 Seyrantepe, Kalkandere		
 Soğuksu, Kalkandere		
 Ünalan, Kalkandere		
 Yenigeçitli, Kalkandere		
 Yeniköy, Kalkandere		
 Yeşilköy, Kalkandere		
 Yokuşlu, Kalkandere		
 Yolbaşı, Kalkandere		
 Yumurtatepe, Kalkandere

Pazar
 Pazar 		
 Akbucak, Pazar		
 Akmescit, Pazar		
 Aktaş, Pazar		
 Aktepe, Pazar		
 Alçılı, Pazar		
 Ardaklı, Pazar
 Balıkçı, Pazar		
 Başköy, Pazar		
 Boğazlı, Pazar		
 Bucak, Pazar		
 Cumhuriyet, Pazar
 Dağdibi, Pazar		
 Darılı, Pazar		
 Derebaşı, Pazar		
 Derinsu, Pazar		
 Dernek, Pazar		
 Elmalık, Pazar	
 Gazi, Pazar	
 Güney, Pazar	
 Güzelyalı, Pazar	
 Hamidiye, Pazar		
 Handağı, Pazar		
 Hasköy, Pazar		
 Hisarlı, Pazar		
 Irmak, Pazar		
 Irmakyeniköy, Pazar		
 İkiztepe, Pazar
 Kayağantaş, Pazar		
 Kesikköprü, Pazar		
 Kirazlık, Pazar
 Kocaköprü, Pazar	
 Kukulat, Pazar	
 Kuzayca, Pazar		
 Merdivenli, Pazar		
 Ocak, Pazar		
 Ortaırmak, Pazar		
 Ortayol, Pazar		
 Örnek, Pazar		
 Papatya, Pazar		
 Sahilköy, Pazar		
 Sessizdere, Pazar		
 Sivrikale, Pazar		
 Sivritepe, Pazar		
 Subaşı, Pazar		
 Suçatı, Pazar		
 Sulak, Pazar		
 Şehitlik, Pazar		
 Şendere, Pazar		
 Şentepe, Pazar		
 Tektaş, Pazar		
 Topluca, Pazar		
 Tütüncüler, Pazar		
 Uğrak, Pazar		
 Yavuz, Pazar		
 Yemişli, Pazar		
 Yeşilköy, Pazar		
 Yücehisar, Pazar

References

List
Rize